The following is a list of current National Arena League (NAL) team rosters:

Albany Empire

Carolina Cobras

Jacksonville Sharks

Orlando Predators

San Antonio Gunslingers

West Texas Warbirds

References

National Arena League
National Arena League